Ceraceomyces is a genus of fungi in the family Amylocorticiaceae. The genus has a widespread distribution and contains 16 species.

Species
Ceraceomyces borealis
Ceraceomyces cerebrosus
Ceraceomyces corymbatus
Ceraceomyces cremeo-ochraceus
Ceraceomyces crispatus
Ceraceomyces cystidiatus
Ceraceomyces microsporus
Ceraceomyces oligodontus
Ceraceomyces reidii
Ceraceomyces serpens
Ceraceomyces sublaevis
Ceraceomyces sulphurinus
Ceraceomyces tessulatus
Ceraceomyces variicolor
Ceraceomyces violascens

References

Amylocorticiales